Martha: Behind Bars (2005) is a TV-movie that aired on September 25, 2005. It chronicled domestic diva Martha Stewart's court case regarding ImClone stocks, and subsequent time behind bars.

While the first movie with Cybill Shepherd as Stewart—2003's Martha, Inc.: The Story of Martha Stewart—aired on NBC, the network's scheduling of The Apprentice: Martha Stewart meant that the second telefilm was picked up by competitor CBS.

Humber College Lakeshore served as a primary location for shooting, servicing as "Camp Cupcake".

This movie aired on Showtime Australia in Australia

It has also been shown on Sky Movies in the UK.

External links
 

2005 television films
2005 films
CBS network films
Films directed by Eric Bross